Gidemi is a village in Phek district, Nagaland. India

References
 kvkphek

Villages in Phek district